is a Tongan born Japanese rugby union player who plays as a Centre or Wing.

References

External links
 

1998 births
Living people
Rugby union centres
Rugby union wings
Sunwolves players
Japanese rugby union players
Japan international rugby union players
Hanazono Kintetsu Liners players